Takuya Matsumoto (松本 拓也, born February 6, 1989) is a Japanese football player. He is the current goalkeeper of FC Gifu.

Club statistics
Updated to 25 December 2021.

Honours
 Blaublitz Akita
 J3 League (1): 2017

References

External links
Profile at Blaublitz Akita
Profile at Kawasaki Frontale
 

1989 births
Living people
Juntendo University alumni
Association football people from Shizuoka Prefecture
Japanese footballers
J1 League players
J2 League players
J3 League players
Shonan Bellmare players
Kawasaki Frontale players
Giravanz Kitakyushu players
Blaublitz Akita players
FC Gifu players
Association football goalkeepers